The Taiwan Cooperative Bank Baseball Team, also known as TCB Baseball Team (Traditional Chinese: 合庫棒球隊), is one of the two amateur baseball teams in Taiwan's First Division amateur baseball league that are owned by government sponsored corporation. The team is owned by Taiwan Cooperative Bank.

Baseball teams in Taiwan